Brenton Griffiths (born 9 February 1991) is a Jamaican footballer who plays as a defender.

Career

Youth 

Griffiths played for St. Catherine High School in the parish St Catherine and Glenmuir High School in Clarendon, Jamaica before earning a soccer scholarship to Tyler Junior College in Texas.  After Tyler JC, he spent two years at the University of South Florida.

Senior 

On 22 January 2013, Griffiths was drafted in the second round (25th overall) of the 2013 MLS Supplemental Draft by the Colorado Rapids and signed to a professional contract three months later. He made his professional debut on 18 May 2013 in a 1–1 draw with the San Jose Earthquakes. He was released by the team on 11 June 2014.

In 2014, Griffiths signed with the Orange County Blues.

In 2016, Griffiths signed with Reno 1868 FC for the 2017 season. Griffiths was released by Reno on 3 December 2018.

Griffiths joined National Premier Soccer League club Miami FC in January 2019.

International 

Griffiths played for Jamaica at the U17 and u20 level.

Honours 

Miami FC
 2019 NPSL Champion
2019 NISA East Coast Championship

References

External links
 

1991 births
Living people
2009 CONCACAF U-20 Championship players
Colorado Rapids draft picks
Colorado Rapids players
Expatriate soccer players in the United States
Jamaican footballers
Jamaican expatriate footballers
Major League Soccer players
Orange County SC players
People from Spanish Town
Reno 1868 FC players
Miami FC players
South Florida Bulls men's soccer players
USL Championship players
National Independent Soccer Association players
Association football defenders